The David Richardson Medal is awarded by the Optical Society (formerly the Optical Society of America) to recognize contributions to optical engineering, primarily in the commercial and industrial sector. The award was first made in 1966 to its namesake David J. Richardson. He received it for distinctive contributions to the ruling and replicating of gratings, used to determine the transfer functions of lenses.  There is a prize associated with the medal.

Richardson received a graduate degree in spectroscopy from the Massachusetts Institute of Technology in the mid-1930s.  He was hired by Bausch and Lomb in 1947 to establish a grating and scale-ruling laboratory that became the world's leader in diffraction gratings. The lab, which was renamed for him in 1966, has since 2004 belonged to the Newport Corporation.

Recipients

See also

 List of physics awards

References 

Awards of Optica (society)